Michelle Ciccolo (born 1968) is a State Representative who represents the 15th Middlesex District in the Massachusetts House of Representatives. She represents the town of Lexington, and part of Woburn. Ciccolo serves on the Joint Committee on Elder Affairs, Joint Committee on Environment, Natural Resources and Agriculture, Joint Committee on Financial Services, and the Joint Committee on Public Health.

See also
 2019–2020 Massachusetts legislature
 2021–2022 Massachusetts legislature

References

Living people
21st-century American politicians
Women state legislators in Massachusetts
Democratic Party members of the Massachusetts House of Representatives
Villanova University alumni
People from Lexington, Massachusetts
University of Massachusetts Boston alumni
21st-century American women politicians
1968 births